Gustavo Adolfo Polidor González [poh-lee-dor'] (October 26, 1961 – April 28, 1995) was a Venezuelan professional baseball shortstop who played for the California Angels (1985–88), Milwaukee Brewers (1989–90) and Florida Marlins (1993). He was born in Caracas, Venezuela.

Polidor played infield for the Holyoke Millers of the Eastern League (Holyoke, MA) in 1981 and 1982. In 1981 he hit for a batting average of .248.

His best year was 1987 with the Angels, when he hit for a .263 batting average, with 2 homers and 15 RBI in 137 at bats. After dropping off to .148 in 1988 he was traded to the Brewers. Polidor played in a career-high 79 games in 1989 and was later a member of the Marlins in their 1993 inaugural season.

In his major league career, Polidor batted .207, with 2 home runs, 35 runs batted in, 33 runs scored, 15 doubles and 3 stolen bases.

Polidor made a brief comeback attempt as a replacement player with the Montreal Expos in spring training of 1995. Less than a month later, he was murdered in Caracas as he tried to protect his son from two men who were trying to steal his car. He was 33 years old.

See also
 List of Major League Baseball players from Venezuela

References

External links
, or Retrosheet, or Pura Pelota (Venezuelan Winter League)

1961 births
1995 deaths
California Angels players
Deaths by firearm in Venezuela
Denver Zephyrs players
Edmonton Trappers players
Florida Marlins players
Holyoke Millers players
Major League Baseball players from Venezuela
Major League Baseball replacement players
Major League Baseball shortstops
Male murder victims
Milwaukee Brewers players
Nashua Angels players
People murdered in Venezuela
Baseball players from Caracas
Tacoma Tigers players
Tiburones de La Guaira players
Venezuelan expatriate baseball players in Canada
Venezuelan expatriate baseball players in the United States
Venezuelan murder victims
Waterbury Angels players
1995 murders in Venezuela